Methanosaeta concilii is an archaeum in the disputed genus Methanosaeta. It is obligately anaerobic, gram-negative and non-motile. It is rod-shaped (length 2.5 to 6.0 μm) with flat ends. The cells are enclosed within a cross-striated sheath. The type strain is GP6 (= DSM 3671 = OGC 69 = NRC 2989 = ATCC 35969). Its genome has been sequenced.

See also
 List of Archaea genera

References

Further reading

External links
LPSN
See this link for an analysis of the genus dispute

Euryarchaeota